Pakistan Telecommunication Company Ltd., commonly known as PTCL 3G is the national telecommunication company in Pakistan. PTCL provides telephone and internet services nationwide and is the backbone for the country's telecommunication infrastructure despite the arrival of a dozen other telecommunication corporations, including Telenor GSM and ZONG4G The corporation manages and operates around 2000 telephone exchanges across the country, providing the largest fixed-line network. Data and backbone services such as GSM, HSPA+, CDMA, LTE, broadband internet, IPTV, and wholesale are an increasing part of its business. Originally a state-owned corporation, the shareholding of Ptcl was reduced to 62%, when 26% of shares and control were sold to Etisalat Telecommunications while the remaining 12% to the general public in 2006 under an intensified privatization program under Prime Minister Shaukat Aziz. However, the 62% of shares still remain under the management of government-ownership of state-owned corporations of Pakistan.

CEO 
On 12 February 2019, PTCL announced that Rashid Khan would be its new CEO. Rashid Khan is acting as CEO of both PTCL, and its subsidiary, Ufone effective from 2 March 2019.

PTCL appointed Mr Hassan Kakar as Chief Executive with effect from 1st December 2020.

In 2021, Etisalat appointed Hatem Bamatraf, an Arab national as the President and Group CEO of PTCL and Ufone.

History

Posts & Telegraph Department 
From the beginning of the Posts & Telegraph Department in 1949 and establishment of Pakistan Telephone & Telegraph Department in 1962, PTCL has been a major player in telecommunication in Pakistan.

Pakistan Telecommunication Corporation 
Pakistan Telecommunication Corporation (PTC) took over operations and functions from Pakistan Telephone and Telegraph Department under Pakistan Telecommunication Corporation Act 1991. This coincided with the Government's competitive policy, encouraging private sector participation and resulting in the award of licenses for cellular, card-operated pay-phones, paging and, lately, data communication services.

Privatization Plan 
Pursuing a progressive policy, the Government in 1991, announced its plans to privatize PTCL, and in 1994 issued six million vouchers exchangeable into 600 million shares of the would-be PTCL in two separate placements. Each had a par value of Rs. 10 per share. These vouchers were converted into PTCL shares in mid-1996.

Pakistan Telecommunication Company Limited 
In 1995, Pakistan Telecommunication (Reorganization) Ordinance formed the basis for PTCL monopoly over basic telephony in the country. The provisions of the Ordinance were lent permanence in October 1996 through Pakistan Telecommunication (Reorganization) Act. The same year, Pakistan Telecommunication Company Limited was formed and listed on all stock exchanges of Pakistan

PTCL launched its mobile and data services subsidiaries in 2001 by the name of Ufone and PakNet respectively. None of the brands made it to the top slots in the respective competitions. Lately, however, Ufone had increased its market share in the cellular sector. The PakNet brand has effectively dissolved over a period of time. Recent DSL services launched by PTCL reflects this by the introduction of a new brand name and operation of the service being directly supervised by PTCL. 

As telecommunication monopolies head towards an imminent end, services and infrastructure providers are set to face even bigger challenges. The post-monopoly era came with Pakistan’s Liberalization in Telecommunication in January 2003. On the Government level, a comprehensive liberalization policy for the telecoms sector is in the offering.

In 2005, Government of Pakistan decided to sell 26 percent of the company to some private corporation. There were three participants in the bidding process for the privatization of PTCL. Etisalat, an Abu Dhabi company was able to get the shares with a large margin in the bid. In June 2005, Etisalat won the 26% of PTCL shares along with management control of the then telecom monopoly for US$2.6 billion. As of 2019, Etisalat has held back $800m amount over a property-transfer dispute with the Pakistani government.

The government's plan of privatizing the corporation was not welcomed in all circles; countrywide protests and strikes were held by PTCL workers. They disrupted phone lines of institutions like Punjab University Lahore along with public sector institutions were also blocked. The military had to take over the management of all the exchanges in the country. They arrested many workers and put them behind bars. The contention between the Government and the employees ended with a 30% increase in the salaries of workers.

Subsidiaries 
PTCL owns two subsidiaries, Ufone and UBank.

Products
PTCL is a part of the consortium of four major Submarine communication cable networks: SEA-ME-WE 3, SEA-ME-WE 4 and I-ME-WE and AAE-1.

Voice 
PTCL provides its fixed-line telephone services in many cities of Pakistan.

Vfone network shutdown 
Voice services used to be provided through PTCL's CDMA2000 network, which was broadcast over the 1900  MHz WLL frequency under the 'Vfone' brand name, however, the network was shut down on 31 August 2016 nationwide.

Internet / high speed broadband 
Being Pakistan's largest ADSL2+ provider, PTCL primarily provides its customers with ADSL broadband, however as demand for higher bandwidth connections has increased, PTCL is upgrading its customers to VDSL2 and FTTH GPON in a few major cities, namely Karachi, Lahore, Islamabad, Rawalpindi, Quetta, Peshawar and Kharian.

Wireless 
Wireless options are also available under the 'EVO Nitro' or 'CharJi Evo' brand names. The former being based on EvDo Rev A and B, and the latter using LTE technology. This is done using PTCL's 1900  MHz WLL frequency that was previously used for their Vfone CDMA2000 network. There is seamless LTE coverage in Karachi, Lahore, Rawalpindi, and Islamabad, whereas there is coverage for EvDo Rev B (up to 9.3 Mbit/s) in the remaining 200+ cities.

Ufone GSM is also a wholly owned subsidiary of PTCL, it also the fourth and the smallest cellular provider (excluding SCO) in the country. It provides both GSM and HSPA+ services over the 900, 1800 and 2100  MHz bands.

In September 2014, for its corporate customers, Pakistan Telecommunication Company Limited (PTCL) launched an exclusive WiFi service called 'Managed WiFi'.

IPTV 
In addition to these services, PTCL also offers digital TV services based on DVB-IPTV with the brand name of PTCL Smart TV. PTCL users can also stream live TV using the SmartTV application for smartphones.

Collaboration with Netflix
In October 2016, PTCL and Netflix signed a collaboration agreement to provide its customers, without commercials, high quality streaming content.

Company profile
PTCL is the largest telecommunications provider in Pakistan. PTCL also continues to be the largest CDMA operator in the country with 0.8 million V-fone customers. The company maintains a leading position in Pakistan as an infrastructure provider to other telecom operators and corporate customers of the country. It has the potential to be an instrumental agent in Pakistan’s economic growth. PTCL has laid Optical Fibre Access Network in the major metropolitan centers of Pakistan and local loop services have started to be modernized and upgraded from copper to an optical network. On the Long Distance and International infrastructure side, the capacity of two SEA-ME-WE submarine cable is being expanded to meet the increasing demand for International traffic.

Changing in format of numbers 
PTCL had started with 10 digit numbers for digital telephones. The first three (in case of smaller cities, 4 or 5) signified the area code (e.g. 042 for Lahore) and the rest (7 for large cities, 6 or 5 for smaller ones) were the subscriber's number. Due to the large demand for landlines in Lahore and Karachi, in 2009, PTCL decided to increase the 7-digit subscriber numbers to 8-digits, adding "9" before existing Government numbers and "3" before the others (e.g. the number 042-7878787 before 2009, was changed to 042-37878787).

5G Trials 
PTCL Group had successfully conducted 5G Trials on a non-commercial basis.

See also 
 List of dialling codes of Pakistan
 National Telecommunication Corporation - Previously part of TNT.
 PTCL Smart TV
 Telephone numbers in Pakistan
 Ufone - A wholly owned cellular subsidiary of PTCL

References

External links 
 PTCL official website

 
Etisalat
Pakistani brands
Telecommunications companies established in 1947
Internet service providers of Pakistan
Telecommunications companies of Pakistan
Companies listed on the Pakistan Stock Exchange
Companies based in Islamabad
Government-owned companies of Pakistan
Information technology companies of Pakistan
 Formerly government-owned companies of Pakistan
Pakistani companies established in 1947